Lee So-hee (Hangul: 이소희; ; born 14 June 1994) is a South Korean badminton player. She won the women's doubles title at the 2017 All England Open tournament. She also helped the Korean national team to win the world team championships at the 2017 Sudirman Cup. She reached a career high of world no. 2 in the women's doubles in November 2017 partnered with Chang Ye-na. For her achievements in 2017, Lee who affiliated with the Incheon International Airport team, was awarded as the best player of the year by the Badminton Korea Association.

As a junior player, Lee was a gold medalists at the 2012 Asian, 2011 and 2012 World Junior Championships in the girls' doubles event. She represented Konkuk University and competed at the Summer Universiade, helped the Korean team clinching the gold medal in the team event in 2013 and 2015, and also won the gold in women's doubles with partner Shin Seung-chan in 2015.

Achievements

BWF World Championships 
Women's doubles

Asian Championships 
Women's doubles

Summer Universiade 
Women's doubles

BWF World Junior Championships 
Girls' doubles

Asian Junior Championships 
Girls' doubles

BWF World Tour (5 titles, 10 runners-up) 
The BWF World Tour, which was announced on 19 March 2017 and implemented in 2018, is a series of elite badminton tournaments sanctioned by the Badminton World Federation (BWF). The BWF World Tour is divided into levels of World Tour Finals, Super 1000, Super 750, Super 500, Super 300, and the BWF Tour Super 100.

Women's doubles

BWF Superseries (3 titles, 6 runners-up) 
The BWF Superseries, which was launched on 14 December 2006 and implemented in 2007, was a series of elite badminton tournaments, sanctioned by the Badminton World Federation (BWF). BWF Superseries levels were Superseries and Superseries Premier. A season of Superseries consisted of twelve tournaments around the world that had been introduced since 2011. Successful players were invited to the Superseries Finals, which were held at the end of each year.

Women's doubles

  BWF Superseries Premier tournament
  BWF Superseries tournament

BWF Grand Prix (5 titles, 6 runners-up) 
The BWF Grand Prix had two levels, the Grand Prix and Grand Prix Gold. It was a series of badminton tournaments sanctioned by the Badminton World Federation (BWF) and played between 2007 and 2017.

Women's doubles

  BWF Grand Prix Gold tournament
  BWF Grand Prix tournament

BWF International Challenge/Series (2 titles, 1 runner-up) 
Women's doubles

Mixed doubles

  BWF International Challenge tournament
  BWF International Series tournament
  BWF Future Series tournament

References

External links 
 
 

1994 births
Living people
Sportspeople from Ulsan
South Korean female badminton players
Badminton players at the 2016 Summer Olympics
Badminton players at the 2020 Summer Olympics
Olympic badminton players of South Korea
Badminton players at the 2018 Asian Games
Asian Games competitors for South Korea
Universiade gold medalists for South Korea
Universiade bronze medalists for South Korea
Universiade medalists in badminton
Medalists at the 2013 Summer Universiade
Medalists at the 2015 Summer Universiade
21st-century South Korean women